

See also
 honcho (disambiguation)